New Year Dash!! (2020) was a professional wrestling pay-per-view (PPV) event produced by New Japan Pro-Wrestling (NJPW). It took place on January 6, 2020, one day after Wrestle Kingdom 14, which is generally considered to be NJPW's biggest show of the year.

The event featured the retirement ceremony of Japanese wrestling legend Jushin Thunder Liger.

Production

Background
New Year Dash!! was announced to be coming to Ōta on September 26, 2019, and was described as the "biggest New Year!! Dash" ever. The event featured blow-off matches for the previous night's Wrestle Kingdom 14 and as is tradition, all matches were revealed the night of the event.

Storylines
New Year Dash!! featured professional wrestling matches that involved different wrestlers from pre-existing scripted feuds and storylines. Wrestlers portrayed villains, heroes, or less distinguishable characters in the scripted events that build tension and culminated in a wrestling match or series of matches.

The previous night at Wrestle Kingdom 14, the IWGP Intercontinental Champion Tetsuya Naito defeated Kazuchika Okada to win the IWGP Heavyweight Championship becoming the first ever dual IWGP Heavyweight and Intercontinental champion. After the match, he was attacked by Kenta, setting up the main event for New Year Dash!! as Naito and Los Ingobernables de Japón teammate Sanada would take on Kenta and his Bullet Club partner Jay White.

Results

See also
2020 in professional wrestling
List of NJPW pay-per-view events

References

2020 in professional wrestling
January 2020 events in Japan
New Japan Pro-Wrestling shows
Professional wrestling in Tokyo
Jushin Liger
2020 in Tokyo